The 2009–10 Penn State Nittany Lions basketball team represented Pennsylvania State University. Head Coach Ed DeChellis was in his seventh season with the team. The team played its home games in University Park, Pennsylvania at the Bryce Jordan Center, which has a capacity of 15,000, for the twelfth consecutive season. This season marked team's the seventeenth consecutive season as a member of the Big Ten Conference. The Nittany Lions entered the season as the defending NIT champions.

On November 30, 2009, the Nittany Lions became the first Big Ten team to win three straight games in the ACC – Big Ten Challenge when they defeated the Virginia Cavaliers. Penn State defeated Virginia Tech in 2007 and Georgia Tech in 2008. The Nittany Lions completed the regular season with an 11–19 (3–15) record.

As the 11 seed they lost in the first round of the 2010 Big Ten Conference men's basketball tournament to 6 seed Minnesota to end their season 11–20

Current coaching staff

Roster

Schedule and Results 

|-
!colspan=6 style=|Exhibition

|-
!colspan=6 style=|Non-conference regular season

|-
!colspan=6 style=|Big Ten regular season

|-
!colspan=6 style=|Big Ten tournament

References

Penn State
Penn State Nittany Lions basketball seasons